The discography of Lorie, a French pop singer, consists of five studio albums, one compilation album, three live albums and eighteen singles. Throughout her singing career, Lorie has obtained success in France, Canada and Francophone Belgium.

Her debut album, Près de Toi, was released on 30 September 2001. It sold about 1.2 million copies and peaked at number two in France. Certified triple platinum, it remains the singer's most successful album and provided the top ten singles "Près de moi", "Je serai (ta meilleure amie)" and "Toute seule".

On 16 September 2002, Lorie released her second album, Tendrement, which entered the French chart at number one. It was led the top ten hit "J'ai besoin d'amour", and spawned Lorie's first number-one single "Sur un air latino", which reached platinum status. The album sold over 1 million units and was certified platinum in France, becoming the singer's second successful studio album. It was followed by Lorie's first concerts tour and the release of her first live album, Live Tour 2003, which was number three in France.

Albums

Studio albums

Live albums

Compilation albums

Singles

Notes

References

Discographies of French artists
Pop music discographies